Rimiterol (INN/USAN) is a third-generation short-acting β2 agonist.

See also 
Isoprenaline
Colterol

References 

2-Benzylpiperidines
Beta-adrenergic agonists
Catecholamines
Phenylethanolamines
2-Piperidinyl compounds